Ecdysone is a prohormone of the major insect molting hormone 20-hydroxyecdysone, which is secreted from the prothoracic glands. It is of steroidal structure. Insect molting hormones (ecdysone and its homologues) are generally called ecdysteroids. Ecdysteroids act as moulting hormones of arthropods but also occur in other related phyla where they can play different roles.<ref>KARLSON P, HOFFMEISTER H: On the biogenesis of ecdyson. Conversion of cholesterol into ecdyson., Hoppe Seylers Z Physiol Chem. 1963 Mar;331:289-300. German. PMID 1396254</ref> In Drosophila melanogaster'', an increase in ecdysone concentration induces the expression of genes coding for proteins that the larva requires, and it causes chromosome puffs (sites of high expression) to form in polytene chromosomes. Recent findings in the laboratory of Chris Q. Doe have found a novel role of this hormone in regulating temporal gene transitions within neural stem cells of the fruit fly. 

Ecdysone and other ecdysteroids also appear in many plants mostly as a protection agent (toxins or antifeedants) against herbivorous insects. These phytoecdysteroids have been reputed to have medicinal value and are part of herbal adaptogenic remedies like Cordyceps, yet an ecdysteroid precursor in plants has been shown to have cytotoxic properties as well as antioxidant properties on lipid peroxidation.

Tebufenozide, sold under the Bayer trademark MIMIC, has ecdysteroid activity although its chemical structure has little resemblance to the ecdysteroids.

See also
 Ecdysone receptor
 PTTH - Metamorphosis Initiator hormone

External links
 Ecdybase, The Ecdysone Handbook - a free online ecdysteroids database

Notes

Steroids
Insect hormones
Insect developmental biology